The Church of Santa Barbara Vergine e Martire is a Roman Catholic place of worship, located in the city center of Turin.

History 
The church was originally built within the walls of the Citadel of Turin during the 16th century, however, in 1856, it was demolished along with the citadel itself, because it was too small to be able to keep up with the city center's growing population. Santa Barbara was then rebuilt between 1867 and 1869 under the direction of architect Pietro Carrera, who designed the church in an eclectic style. It was then consecrated in April 1869 by Archbishop Alessandro Ricardi di Netro.

References 

Roman Catholic churches completed in 1869
Roman Catholic churches in Turin
19th-century Roman Catholic church buildings in Italy